Draga Olteanu Matei (née Olteanu) (24 October 1933 – 18 November 2020) was a Romanian actress. She performed in more than thirty films from 1967 to 2006. 

Born in Bucharest, she studied at the Iulia Hasdeu High School in Lugoj. After moving to Brașov at age 17, she returned to Bucharest, where she graduated in 1956 from the I.L. Caragiale Institute of Theatre and Film Arts. In 1970 she married Ion Matei, a doctor from Piatra Neamț.

Draga Olteanu Matei was awarded the Order of the Star of Romania, Knight rank in May 2002 and the Order of the Crown of Romania, Officer rank in October 2014. She received a star on the Romanian Walk of Fame in Bucharest on 29 October 2011.

Selected filmography

References

External links

 

1933 births
2020 deaths
Actresses from Bucharest
20th-century Romanian actresses
21st-century Romanian actresses
Caragiale National University of Theatre and Film alumni
Knights of the Order of the Star of Romania
Officers of the Order of the Crown (Romania)
Deaths from gastrointestinal hemorrhage